Kao the Kangaroo: Mystery of the Volcano is an adventure platformer video game released in 2005 by Tate Interactive.

Plot
In this installment, Kao ends up in an archipelago where he has to collect four artifacts to overcome evil forces manifesting from a nearby volcano, in order to get inside and defeat the God of the Volcano and free his friend.

Release
The game, alongside the original Kao the Kangaroo and Kao the Kangaroo: Round 2 were added to GOG.com and to Zoom-Platform in February 2021.

Notes

References

1C Company games
2005 video games
3D platform games
Action-adventure games
Fiction about deities
Jungles in fiction
Kao the Kangaroo
Video games about kangaroos and wallabies
Video games about birds
Video games set in Australia
Single-player video games
Windows-only games
Windows games
Works about volcanoes
Video games developed in Poland
Video games set on islands